Bernard Joseph "Benny" Henderson (c.1926 – c.1993) was an Irish former soccer player.
Benny is survived by his wife Esther Mary (née Doyle) and son's Benny, Christy, Liam, Hazel, and Rose having died in 1993.
He played for Drumcondra F.C. and Dundalk F.C. at club level.

On 23 May 1948, he won his first senior cap for the Republic of Ireland national football team when he lined out on the left wing in a 2-0 defeat to Portugal in a friendly international played in Lisbon.

He played his only other senior international a week later in Barcelona when Ireland were beaten 2-1 by Spain in another friendly international.

Honours
 League of Ireland: 2
 Drumcondra F.C. 1947/48, 1948/49
 FAI Cup: 2
 Drumcondra F.C. 1946, 1954

References

The Complete Who's Who of Irish International Football, 1945-96 (1996):Stephen McGarrigle

1926 births
1993 deaths
Association footballers from County Dublin
Republic of Ireland association footballers
Ireland (FAI) international footballers
League of Ireland players
Drumcondra F.C. players
Bohemian F.C. players
Association football midfielders